The Humboldt station is a former railway station in Humboldt, Saskatchewan. It was built by the Canadian Northern Railway along the Winnipeg to Edmonton mainline.  The -story, wood-frame, railway station was completed in 1905. The last CNR passenger train (#9 and #10) ended service in 1963 with service restored in 1978; Via Rail railliner served the station in 1980. The building was designated a historic railway station in 1992.

See also
 List of designated heritage railway stations of Canada

References 

Designated Heritage Railway Stations in Saskatchewan
Canadian National Railway stations in Saskatchewan
Canadian Northern Railway stations in Saskatchewan
Railway stations in Canada opened in 1905
Railway stations closed in 1980
Disused railway stations in Canada
Humboldt, Saskatchewan
1905 establishments in Saskatchewan